Duke Ragan (born September 18, 1997) is an American professional boxer who won a silver medal in the featherweight division at the 2020 Summer Olympics in Tokyo.

Amateur/Olympic career
After learning the sport at the Cincinnati Golden Gloves boxing club in the Over-the-Rhine neighborhood of his hometown,  Ragan won silver medals at the 2017 World Championships and the 2019 Pan American Games as an amateur in the bantamweight division. In June 2021, less than a year after he turned pro, Ragan learned he had qualified for the Tokyo Olympics as a featherweight.

Ragan won his first four bouts in Tokyo to qualify for the gold medal bout, beating seeded Samuel Kistohurry and Serik Temirzhanov in the process. He lost the Olympic final 3:2 to fellow professional Albert Batyrgaziev of the Russian team. Ragan won the third round on four of the five judges' scorecards, but attributed his defeat to a slow start.

Ragan still became the first professional boxer to win a medal for the U.S. team. He also became only the second silver medalist for the American men's team since 2004, joining Shakur Stevenson.

Professional career
Ragan turned pro in July 2020 with James Prince as his manager. He was initially set to make his debut on August 8. In August, he signed a multi-year promotional contract with Bob Arum's Top Rank, with his rescheduled debut set for August 22 against Luis Alvarado on the undercard of Eleider Alvarez vs. Joe Smith Jr. at the MGM Grand Conference Center in Paradise, Nevada. Ragan knocked Alvarado down with a right hand in the first round. He made it back to his feet before referee Jay Nady's count of ten. Disorientated, Alavarado turned his back on Nady which prompted him to call a halt to the contest, handing Ragan a first-round technical knockout (TKO) victory.

Professional boxing record

References

External links
Team USA profile for Duke Ragan

Living people
1997 births
American male boxers
Boxers from Cincinnati
Bantamweight boxers
AIBA World Boxing Championships medalists
Pan American Games medalists in boxing
Pan American Games silver medalists for the United States
Medalists at the 2019 Pan American Games
Medalists at the 2020 Summer Olympics
Olympic silver medalists for the United States in boxing
Boxers at the 2020 Summer Olympics